Paul de Waal (2 June 1875 – 18 May 1945) was a South African international rugby union player who played as a forward.

He made 1 appearance for South Africa against the British Lions in 1896.

References

South African rugby union players
South Africa international rugby union players
1875 births
1945 deaths
Rugby union forwards
Western Province (rugby union) players